William H. Ahmanson (October 12, 1925 – October 14, 2008) was an American chief executive, philatelist and philanthropist from Los Angeles, California. He served as the chairman and chief executive officer of H. F. Ahmanson & Co. from 1969 to 1984. He also served as vice chairman of The Ahmanson Foundation.

Early life and education
William Hayden. Ahmanson was born on October 12, 1925, in Omaha, Nebraska. He had a brother, Robert H. Ahmanson. His father served as president of the National American Insurance Co. of Omaha. His uncle, Howard F. Ahmanson Sr., was the founder of H. F. Ahmanson & Co., an insurance and savings and loans corporation based in Los Angeles. He graduated from the University of California, Los Angeles (UCLA) with a bachelor's degree in business and finance in 1949.

Career
He served as chief executive officer and chairman of the board of H. F. Ahmanson & Co. from 1969 to 1984. He served on the board of trustees of The Ahmanson Foundation from 1952 to 2008. Over the course of his career, he supported many venues related to the arts and sciences, including the Greater Los Angeles Zoo Association, the California Institute of the Arts, and the Doheny Eye Institute. 

As a philatelist, he donated his extensive collection of Canadian stamps from British Columbia, Vancouver Island, New Brunswick, Nova Scotia, Prince Edward Island, and Newfoundland to the National Postal Museum. It is known as the "Ahmansion Collection."

Personal life
He was married to Carol Ahmanson. They had eight children and twelve grandchildren. He died of emphysema on October 14, 2008 in Malibu, California.

References

1925 births
2008 deaths
Businesspeople from Omaha, Nebraska
People from Malibu, California
American chief executives of financial services companies
UCLA Anderson School of Management alumni
American philatelists
20th-century American philanthropists
20th-century American businesspeople